Glycomyces is a genus of Gram-positive bacteria.

Species
Glycomyces comprises the following species:
 Glycomyces albidus Qian et al. 2020
 Glycomyces albus Han et al. 2014
 Glycomyces algeriensis Labeda and Kroppenstedt 2004
 Glycomyces anabasis Zhang et al. 2018
 Glycomyces arizonensis Labeda and Kroppenstedt 2004
 Glycomyces artemisiae Zhang et al. 2014
 Glycomyces buryatensis Nikitina et al. 2020
 Glycomyces dulcitolivorans Mu et al. 2018
 Glycomyces endophyticus Qin et al. 2008
 Glycomyces fuscus Han et al. 2014
 Glycomyces halotolerans Guan et al. 2012
 Glycomyces harbinensis Labeda et al. 1985
 Glycomyces lacisalsi Guan et al. 2016
 Glycomyces lechevalierae Labeda and Kroppenstedt 2004
 "Glycomyces luteolus" Duan et al. 2019
 Glycomyces mayteni Qin et al. 2009
 Glycomyces paridis Fang et al. 2018
 Glycomyces phytohabitans Xing et al. 2015
 Glycomyces rhizosphaerae Li et al. 2018
 Glycomyces rutgersensis Labeda et al. 1985
 Glycomyces sambucus Gu et al. 2007
 Glycomyces scopariae Qin et al. 2009
 Glycomyces sediminimaris Mohammadipanah et al. 2018
 Glycomyces tarimensis Lv et al. 2015
 Glycomyces tenuis Evtushenko et al. 1991
 Glycomyces terrestris Li et al. 2021
 "Glycomyces tritici" Li et al. 2018
 Glycomyces xiaoerkulensis Wang et al. 2018
 "Glycomyces xinjiangensis" Guan et al. 2017

References

Bacteria genera
Actinomycetia